Crundale is a mostly rural village and civil parish in the Ashford District of Kent in southeast England. The village covers a section of one of the dual escarpments of the North Downs at this point, about halfway between Ashford and Canterbury.

Geography
About a quarter of the village is woodland, and barring its western side which slopes steeply to the Great Stour, which is at 92 feet (28 metres) above sea level, most of the rest of its land is at more than 260 feet (80 metres) above Ordnance Datum.

Amenities
The community living in the civil parish is relatively small - many of its activities are shared with the neighbouring parish of Godmersham.

History
An early Anglo-Saxon gold buckle and other princely items from a grave dating from the mid-7th century were found in the Crundale Downs in 1861 and are now in the British Museum. The intricately designed object is notable for the representation of a three dimensional appliqué fish.

The early Norman parish church is dedicated to St Mary the Blessed Virgin and is a building listed in the highest category of the national system, at Grade I. It is on the escarpment of the Crundale Downs, a less eroded top layer of the escarpment, making it higher, about half a mile southeast of the village mainstay which is made up of dual clusters very close to each other and connected by road and by separate footpath. The tombs of Juliana Hervey and Reverend Francis Paine are separately listed.

Recreation
A national trail footpath runs north-south through the civil parish, linking to Canterbury and to Ashford.

References

External links

Crundale Church at John E. Vigar's Kent Churches

Villages in Kent
Villages in the Borough of Ashford
Civil parishes in Ashford, Kent